Malicorne may refer to:

 Malicorne (band), a French band, named after Malicorne-sur-Sarthe

Places in France
 Malicorne-sur-Sarthe, in the Sarthe department
 Malicorne, Allier, in the Allier department
 Malicorne, Yonne, in the Yonne department